is a Japanese former Nippon Professional Baseball infielder.

References 

1971 births
Living people
Baseball people from Kanagawa Prefecture 
Nippon Professional Baseball infielders
Yakult Swallows players
Salinas Spurs players
Fukuoka Daiei Hawks players
Chunichi Dragons players
Orix BlueWave players
Japanese expatriate baseball players in the United States
Japanese baseball coaches
Nippon Professional Baseball coaches